The Pecos League of Professional Baseball Clubs is an independent professional baseball league headquartered in Houston, which operates in cities in desert mountain regions throughout California, New Mexico, Arizona, Colorado, Kansas, Oklahoma, and Texas. The league plays in cities that do not have Major League Baseball or Minor League Baseball teams and is not affiliated with either.

The Pecos League season is a highly condensed one. Schedules vary, but teams have reportedly played as many as 70 games in 72 days, or 80 games in three months. The weekly salary is around $50 per player.

History 
The Pecos League operated six teams in the 2011 and 2012 seasons and expanded to eight teams for 2013. Continued growth saw the league reach a high of 10 teams for 2014.

The Pecos League also operates a spring developmental league, which is a one-month showcase beginning in March for recent college graduates and free agents looking to catch on to a full season league.

In May 2014, Fox Sports 1 aired a six-part documentary about life in the Pecos League, mostly based on the Trinidad Triggers.

In August 2014, Jon Edwards made his major league debut with the Texas Rangers becoming the first player in Pecos League history to play in Major League Baseball.

In September 2016, Chris Smith was called up to the Toronto Blue Jays becoming the second player from the Pecos League to make a major league roster, though he did not appear in a game. Smith would eventually make his debut for the Blue Jays on June 27, 2017, against the Baltimore Orioles.

For 2016, the Las Vegas Train Robbers moved to Topeka, Kansas. Expansion teams were added in Great Bend, Kansas and Tucson, Arizona.

On February 25, 2016 it was announced that the Las Cruces Vaqueros would sit out the 2016 season due to severe damage to their home stadium. Expansion team Salina Stockade was added to the league and played a limited 11-game home schedule in 2016.

Following the 2016 season, a drastic shift in the Pecos League landscape occurred as two Kansas teams, the Salina Stockade and Great Bend Boom, both folded, while a third, the Topeka Train Robbers, moved to Bakersfield, California, taking the place of the former Bakersfield Blaze, who folded following the 2016 California League season.

The Train Robbers were joined in California for 2017 by three expansion teams: the High Desert Yardbirds (replacing the California League's High Desert Mavericks), the Monterey Amberjacks, and California City Whiptails. The league also announced a travel team, the Hollywood Stars, who played a handful of home games in Los Angeles.

For 2019, the Ruidoso Osos were replaced by the Wasco Reserves, and the league reduced the number of divisions from three to two.

For 2020, the Martinez Sturgeon and Santa Cruz Seaweed were announced as expansion teams, and the San Rafael Pacifics were added from the Pacific Association. They joined the all-California Pacific Division, and replaced the California City Whiptails and High Desert Yardbirds in the circuit. The Tucson Saguaros moved to the Mountain Division, taking the place of the White Sands Pupfish. Interdivisional games would not be played to cut down on travel and other expenses. Later, due to the COVID-19 pandemic, the league announced that the Mountain Division teams would not play at their home stadiums, and that 4 of the 6 teams would play a condensed 36-game season beginning on July 1, 2020. All games were played at Coastal Baseball Park in Houston, Texas. The Pacific Division originally planned on enacting a similar format, but due to the ongoing pandemic, were unable to compete in 2020.

For the 2021 season, the Salina Stockade returned and the league announced the addition of the Colorado Springs Snow Sox as an expansion team. On April 4, the league announced its final division alignment for the season, which did not include California City and High Desert after previously indicating each would return. On August 3, the league announced the Bay Series between the San Rafael Pacifics, Monterey Amberjacks, Martinez Sturgeon, and Santa Cruz Seaweed after the Bakersfield Train Robbers tested positive for COVID-19 and had to cancel their final home series.  The Pecos League operated the Houston Apollos in the American Association as a travel team.

In April 2021, Yermin Mercedes was called up to the Chicago White Sox where he set a major league record as the first baseball player in modern MLB history to begin a season with eight consecutive hits.

For the 2022 season, the league announced three expansion franchises: the Santa Rosa Scuba Divers, Austin Weirdos, and Weimar Hormigas. After competing in 2021, Salina was not included as a member club in 2022.

Before 2023, the league introduced 3 new teams; the Lancaster Sound Breakers, Marysville Drakes, and the Blackwell Fly Catchers. The Weimar Hormigas, Colorado Springs Snow Sox and Wasco Reserve folded. Tucson moved back to the Mountain Division, while the Santa Cruz Seaweed moved to Vallejo, California.

Spring League

The league has a spring training league where teams play games against each other. Professionals, prospects and others compete.

Current teams

Former teams

Proposed teams that never played

A high number of Pecos League teams postponed their premiere seasons before they were slated to play, like the Pueblo Diablos (Bighorns) in Colorado, and Douglas Diablos, Maricopa Monsoon in Arizona and Nogales Sonorans or Skeletons.

League timeline

Champions

References

External links
 
Pecos League Encyclopedia and History at BaseballReference.com
Pecos League at IndependentBaseball.net

 
Sports leagues established in 2010
Independent baseball leagues in the United States
2010 establishments in the United States
Professional sports leagues in the United States
Baseball leagues in New Mexico
Baseball leagues in California
Baseball leagues in Kansas
Baseball leagues in Arizona
Baseball leagues in Colorado
Baseball leagues in Texas